Frederik Elkær (born 8 December 2001) is a Danish professional footballer, who plays as a left-back for Hobro IK.

Club career

Hobro IK
Elkær joined Hobro IK in the summer 2019. On 8 July 2020, Elkær got his official debut for Hobro in the Danish Superliga against AC Horsens. He played all 90 minutes of the game and became the youngest Danish Superliga debutant in the history of Hobro IK.

References

External links
 Frederik Elkær at Hobro IK
 

2001 births
Living people
Danish men's footballers
Danish Superliga players
Viborg FF players
Silkeborg IF players
Hobro IK players
Association football defenders